Rex Allen Baddeley (born 6 November 1941 in Whanganui) is a former New Zealand cricketer who played 13 first-class matches for the Auckland Aces in Plunket Shield beginning in the 1969–70 season and ending in the 1971–72 season.

External links
 

1941 births
Living people
Auckland cricketers
Cricketers from Whanganui
20th-century New Zealand people